Bertel Dahlgaard (7 November 1887 – 31 March 1972), was a Danish politician, member of Folketinget for the Social Liberal Party 1920–1960, and statistician. As a Minister twice, as well as a leading member of his party for two decades, he was known for his pragmatism and tactical skills.

1887 births
1972 deaths
People from Viborg Municipality
Danish Social Liberal Party politicians
Danish Interior Ministers
Members of the Folketing